Miller/Knox Lagoon is a lake in Richmond, California.

Overview
The lake is fed by underground salt water from San Pablo Bay and is man-made. It is located in the Pt. Richmond neighborhood. The pond is located within Miller/Knox Regional Park. The hole in the ground that was filled to form a water body was formerly part of quarries used during public works in the city of Richmond during the World War II home front.

See also
List of lakes in California
List of lakes in the San Francisco Bay Area

References

Lakes of the San Francisco Bay Area
Bodies of water of Richmond, California
Lakes of Contra Costa County, California
Reservoirs in California
Lakes of Northern California
Lakes of California